"Four to the Floor" is a song by British band Starsailor. The song was released as the third and final single from the band's second album, Silence Is Easy (2003), and became a hit, peaking at number one in France and Wallonia, number five in Australia, and number 24 in the United Kingdom. The Thin White Duke remix of the song was ranked number 70 on Triple J's Hottest 100 of 2004 in Australia. As of July 2014, it was the 84th best-selling single of the 21st century in France, with 333,000 units sold.

Music videos
 
There are two different videos for "Four to the Floor." In the first one, the band played in a scenario accompanied by the members of a symphonic orchestra appearing and disappearing according to the development of the song and the instruments.

The second video features a genderless little person of unknown age in a hooded winter jacket spray-painting graffiti on public walls in or near the city of London. The band members of Starsailor are depicted as animated graffiti whilst playing the title song throughout. At the end of the video the faceless, anonymous elfin creature is caught while standing on a bridge and shaken down by the police. One of the scenes in the video can be seen as the art cover for the Hard-Fi single Hard to Beat. An shorter edit was also made, using the Thin White Duke remix of the song.

The video also shows the images of famous Argentine revolutionary Che Guevara and Ben Byrne wears a T-shirt with the word "socialism" though there is not a clear connection between those images and the concept of the video.

Track listings

UK CD single
 "Four to the Floor" (radio edit)
 "A Message"

UK 10-inch single
A1. "Four to the Floor" (radio edit)
A2. "A Message"
B1. "Four to the Floor" (Thin White Duke mix)

German mini-CD single
 "Four to the Floor" – 4:11
 "At the End of a Show" – 4:12

European maxi-CD single
 "Four to the Floor"
 "At the End of a Show"
 "White Dove" (original demo)

Australian maxi-CD single
 "Four to the Floor"
 "Four to the Floor" (Soulsavers mix)
 "Four to the Floor" (Thin White Duke mix)

Charts

Weekly charts

Year-end charts

Certifications

Release history

References

2003 songs
2004 singles
Black-and-white music videos
EMI Records singles
SNEP Top Singles number-one singles
Songs written by Barry Westhead
Songs written by Ben Byrne
Songs written by James Stelfox
Songs written by James Walsh (musician)
Songs critical of religion
Starsailor (band) songs
Ultratop 50 Singles (Wallonia) number-one singles